Parliamentary elections were held in Colombia on 8 March 1998 to elect the Senate and Chamber of Representatives. The result was a victory for the Liberal Party, which won 84 of the 161 seats in the Chamber and 48 of the 102 seats in the Senate.

Results

Senate

Chamber of Representatives

References

Parliamentary elections in Colombia
Colombia
1998 in Colombia
March 1998 events in South America
Election and referendum articles with incomplete results